Swedish Red or Swedish Red Cattle may refer to any one of several red Swedish cattle breeds, including:

 Swedish Red-and-White ( or SRB), a dairy breed
 Swedish Red Pied, ( or RSB), a former dairy breed now merged into the above
 Swedish Red Polled,, a traditional dual-purpose breed

Red cattle